Tomasz Józef Zamoyski (1678–1725) was a Polish nobleman (szlachcic).

Tomasz became the 5th Ordynat of Zamość estate. He was also starost of Płoskirów and Gródek and became a Royal Colonel.

1678 births
1725 deaths
People from Khmelnytskyi, Ukraine
Tomasz Jozef